Raniero Dandolo or Rainero Dandolo ( 1204–42) was a Venetian admiral and statesman, titled Procurator of San Marco and Vice-Doge of Venice. The son of the 41st Doge of Venice, Enrico Dandolo (r. 1192–1205), he served as Vice-Doge during his father's absence. His daughter Anna Dandolo married Serbian Grand Prince, subsequently King, Stefan Nemanjić (r. 1196–1228) in 1217.

References

Republic of Venice admirals
Procurators of Saint Mark
House of Dandolo
13th-century Venetian people